Batangas Bay is a semi-enclosed body of water situated in the province of Batangas in Luzon island in the Philippines. The bay is an extension of the Verde Island Passage and is separated from the Balayan Bay to the west by the Calumpan Peninsula, which juts out to Maricaban Island across the Maricaban Strait.

The bay is bordered by Batangas City and the municipalities of Mabini, Bauan, San Pascual and Tingloy on Maricaban Island.

The bay is lined with industrial plants ranging from oil refining to food processing to ship building. Many fishermen thrive around the area. The bay is also host to valuable environmental resources, such as coral reefs that attract thousands of tourists every year.

References

External links 

 Batangas Coastalink
 Partnerships in Environmental Management in the Seas of East Asia

Bays of the Philippines
Landforms of Batangas